Temnora scitula is a moth of the family Sphingidae. It is known from forests from the Gambia to Congo, Angola and Uganda. There is an isolated population in eastern Tanzania.

The length of the forewings is 19–23 mm. It is immediately distinguishable from all other Temnora species by the two translucent white spots on the postmedian band, one of which is sometimes longitudinally doubled. The forewing upperside has an oblique brown band and a white translucent spot proximally of this band, followed by vestiges of one or two dots, and another white translucent spot. The hindwing upperside is orange-brown, with a paler median band and a deep brown marginal band.

References

Temnora
Moths described in 1889
Insects of Uganda
Insects of Angola
Fauna of the Central African Republic
Fauna of the Republic of the Congo
Fauna of Gabon
Fauna of the Gambia
Insects of Tanzania
Fauna of Zambia
Moths of Africa